Minuscule 230 (in the Gregory-Aland numbering), ε 173 (Soden), is a Greek minuscule manuscript of the New Testament Gospels, on parchment. It is dated by a colophon to the year 1013 CE.

Description 

The codex contains the complete text of the four Gospels on 218 parchment leaves (size ), with a small lacunae of John 20:27-21:12 due to a missing page. The leaves are arranged in quarto (four leaves in quire). The text is written in two columns per page, 24 lines per page.

Text 

The Greek text of the codex is considered a representative of the Caesarean text-type. Aland placed it in Category III.
The manuscript belongs to the textual family Ferrar Group (ƒ13).

According to the Claremont Profile Method it represents textual group Λ in Luke 1, Luke 10, and Luke 20 (though in Luke 20 it is a very weak member).

History 

The colophon reads as follows: Ετελειωθη η ιερα βιβλος αυτη μην οκτωβριω κθ, ημερα παρασκευη, ωρα θ, ετει ςφκβ. Ινδ. Ιβ. Γραφεν δια χειρος Λουκα μοναχου και ευτελους ιερεως. According to E. Miller this date corresponds to 1014 CE. Actually it is deciphered as 1013 A.D.

The manuscript was written by Luke, a monk and scribe.

It was described by Moldenhawer, who collated it about 1783 CE for Birch. It was briefly described by Emmanuel Miller in 1848. Jacob Greelings examined the text of the Gospel of John.

It is currently housed at the Real Biblioteca del Monasterio de El Escorial (Cod. Escurialensis, y. III. 5).

See also 

 List of New Testament minuscules
 Biblical manuscript
 Textual criticism

References

Further reading 

 Emmanuel Miller, Catalogue des manuscrits grecs de la bibliothèque de l'Escurial (Paris 1848), p. 280.
 J. Geerlings, Family 13 in John, S & D XXI.

Greek New Testament minuscules
12th-century biblical manuscripts